Akai is a village and deh in Shaheed Fazil Rahu taluka of Badin District, Sindh. As of 2017, it has a population of 3,373, in 609 households. It is part of the tapedar circle of Gharo.

References 

Populated places in Badin District